Gideon Gadot (1 April 1941 – 21 September 2012) was an Israeli journalist and politician who served as a member of the Knesset for Likud between 1984 and 1992.

Biography
Gideon Foreman (later Gadot) was born in Bnei Brak during the Mandate era. He attended the Mikveh Israel agricultural high school before studying sociology and communications at university in South Africa. He joined the Betar youth movement in 1951, and was a member of the organisation's national leadership between 1965 and 1968. During his time in South Africa, he acted as an emissary for the organisation.

He worked as a journalist for Herut, HaYom, and Yom Yom, before becoming head of the Herut party's spokesperson's section in 1977, working there until 1982. From 1981 to 1996 he was chairman of the board of Mifal HaPayis, Israel's national lottery.

In 1984, he was elected to the Knesset on the Likud list (then an alliance of Herut and other right-wing parties). He was re-elected in 1988 and appointed Deputy Speaker, a position he held for four years. Gadot lost his seat in the 1992 elections.

He was the nephew of Aryeh Ben-Eliezer.

Gadot died on 21 September 2012, and was buried at Nahalat Yitzhak cemetery in Tel Aviv on 23 September 2012.

References

External links

1941 births
2012 deaths
Jews in Mandatory Palestine
People from Bnei Brak
Betar members
Israeli journalists
Members of the 11th Knesset (1984–1988)
Members of the 12th Knesset (1988–1992)
Herut politicians
Likud politicians
Deputy Speakers of the Knesset
Burials at Nahalat Yitzhak Cemetery